Carlos Arroyo (born 1979) is a Puerto Rican professional basketball player. 

Carlos Arroyo may also refer to:
 Carlos Arroyo (architect) (born 1964), Spanish architect
 Carlos Alberto Arroyo del Río (1893–1969), President of Ecuador, 1940–1944